Gabriela Anders (born March 17, 1972 in Buenos Aires) is an Argentine singer and pianist.

Anders started out on classical guitar, then studied piano at a conservatory in Buenos Aires. In the U.S., she was influenced by jazz and listened to the music of Stan Getz, Dexter Gordon, and John Coltrane. While she was in college, she sang with Tito Puente and Grover Washington Jr. Her first album, Fantasia was released in 1996. This was followed by Wanting released in 1998.

References

External links
 Official website

1972 births
Living people
20th-century Argentine women singers
Ballad musicians
Singers from Buenos Aires